"U Don't Have to Call" is a song by American singer Usher. It was written by Pharrell Williams and produced by the Neptunes for Usher's third studio album, 8701 (2001). The song was released as the third US single from the album and the fifth international single. In the US, it was initially serviced to radio on January 18, 2002, and it was eventually issued as a commercial single in Europe and Australia later in the year.

"U Don't Have to Call" peaked at number three on the US Billboard Hot 100 singles chart. In the United Kingdom, it was released as a double A-side with "I Need a Girl (Part One)" by P. Diddy, on which Usher provides additional vocals; this release reached number four on the UK Singles Chart. "U Don't Have to Call" won Usher his second consecutive Grammy Award for Best Male R&B Vocal Performance in 2003. The single's music video was filmed in Los Angeles at the Westin Bonaventure Hotel and features Usher going to a club with Sean Combs and other celebrities.

Track listings

US 12-inch single
A1. "U Don't Have to Call" (radio edit) – 3:59
A2. "U Don't Have to Call" (instrumental) – 4:32
B1. "U Don't Have to Call" (album version) – 4:30
B2. "U Don't Have to Call" (acappella) – 4:21

Australian CD single
 "U Don't Have to Call" (radio edit) – 3:59
 "U Don't Have to Call" (remix featuring Ludacris) – 4:18
 "U Don't Have to Call" (Pete Avila's organic club mix) – 6:16
 "Nice & Slow" (B-Rock's Basement mix) – 4:03

New Zealand CD single
 "U Don't Have to Call" (radio edit) – 3:59
 "U Don't Have to Call" (Pete Avila's organic club mix) – 6:16
 "U Don't Have to Call" (Pound Boys Boogie vocal) – 6:47
 "U Don't Have to Call" (remix featuring Ludacris radio edit) – 4:18

European CD single
 "U Don't Have to Call" – 3:53
 "U Don't Have to Call" (remix featuring Ludacris) – 5:08
 "U Turn" – 3:12

UK CD single
 "I Need a Girl (Part One)" 
 "U Don't Have to Call" (remix featuring Ludacris)
 "I Need a Girl (Part Two)" 
 "I Need a Girl (Part One)" (video)
 "U Don't Have to Call" (LP version video clip)

UK 12-inch single
A1. "I Need a Girl (Part One)" 
B1. "U Don't Have to Call" (remix featuring Ludacris)
B2. "I Need a Girl (Part Two)"

Credits and personnel
Credits are lifted from the European CD single liner notes.

Studio
 Recorded at The Record Plant (Los Angeles, California)
 Mixed at Right Track Recording (Manhattan, New York City) and Criteria (Miami, Florida)

Personnel

 The Neptunes – production
 Pharrell Williams – writing, all instruments, arrangement
 Chad Hugo – all instruments, arrangement
 Usher – vocals
 Brian Garten – recording
 Supa Engineer "Duro" – mixing
 Scott Kieklak – mixing assistant

Charts

Weekly charts

Year-end charts

Release history

References

2002 singles
2002 songs
Arista Records singles
Bertelsmann Music Group singles
Music videos directed by Director X
Song recordings produced by the Neptunes
Songs written by Pharrell Williams
Usher (musician) songs